Poramadulla Central College is a public national school in Rikillagaskada, Hanguranketha, Sri Lanka. Flanked by the Diyatalawa mount on one side and the Kandapola area on the other, the school serves as a sports school that helps train children talented in sports to improve and harness their skills.

The school provides secondary education.

History

Poramadulla Central College opened in Karandagolla in 1901. The school became a Bilingual school. At one point it moved to the campus of Poramadulla primary school. On 16 September 1945 the school was designated as a Central College due to a request from the villagers and principal M.D Gunawardhana. On 16 September 1945 the school began holding classes in its current facility. The school's website stated that "it is believed that girls' hostel is the [“Opatha walawwa" (Mahagedara walawwa)] [at present]."

The current main building opened on 15 November 1956. In 1957 the girls' hostel opened in the main building and a boys' hostel opened during the same year. In 1957 the girls' hostel moved to "Opatha walawwa". In 1959, The college's magazine "Vidueliya magazine" (විදු එළිය) began publication,. and a gymnasium and open theatre opened in 1962.

Athletics, activities, and clubs
The school's athletic programs include badminton, basketball, cricket, hockey, karate, netball, volleyball, and wrestling. The school was one of the first in the Nuwara Eliya District to play hard ball cricket.

In October 2010, the Sri Lankan sports minister, C. B. Rathnayake, announced that the ministry would develop and upgrade the sports facilities on the college grounds. The grounds, first developed in 1998 by then sports & youth affairs minister and one of the renowned past pupil of the school, Hon. S. B. Dissanayaka, esq., as it was designed as a national sports ground by him so that all sports could be played, including volleyball, cricket, football, table tennis, badminton, netball, and basketball.and a fully equipped indoor badminton court also constructed by him during his time as a part of the future national level sports complex. the same minister Mr. Dissanayaka went further into put up a school poultry farm as well with the ministry fund to provide nutritious meals for the pupils of the same sports school too. When that field fell into disrepair, the cricket team began to play its home matches at a local prison camp. However, in fairness to the former minister S. B. Dissanayaka it has to be mentioned here that the assistance he provided to the school cricket team with the intention of transforming the college to a leading cricket playing school was commendable and already gone to the history of the school too.

In addition the school has a chess team. Clubs held by the school include the Air Force cadet corps, the Army Cadets corps, Boy Scouts, the Eastern Band, the English Literary Association, the Girl Guiding Group, Mahavali Environment Project Group, the Photographic Association, IT society, Red Cross Society, Science Society, Sinhala Literary Association, St. John's Ambulance Service Society, and the Western Band.

See also

References

External links
  of Poramadulla Central College

Educational institutions established in 1901
1901 establishments in the British Empire
Schools in Nuwara Eliya District